Muhsen Bilal (born 1944) is a Syrian surgeon, ambassador and Ba'athist politician.

Early life and education
Bilal was born into a prominent Alawite family in Burghalieh, Tartus Governorate, in 1944. His father lived in Argentina between 1930 and 1936, where he worked as an Arabic teacher. He studied medicine at the University of Padua, graduating in 1970. In 1976, he specialized in surgery in Italy. Then he received his PhD in medicine and surgery from the University of Pennsylvania with the specialization in liver transplantation. Bilal married Dr. Faten Rustum, a prominent fellow doctor.

Career
After graduation, Bilal became the head of surgery at the Al Assad University Hospital. He then served as a professor of surgery at the faculty of medicine at Damascus University from 1977 to 2001.

His political career started in 1977 when he was elected to the Peoples Assembly. In 1981, he was named the chairman of the Arab and foreign affairs committee, and served in this position until 1985. He led the Syrian delegation at the 1982 World Peace Conference in Prague. In 2001, he became Syria's ambassador to Spain, and he held this post until he was appointed minister of information to the cabinet headed by then prime minister Mohammad Naji Otari in February 2006. He replaced Mahdi Dakhlallah as information minister. When Bilal was in office, he acted as chief spokesperson for the Syrian government during the Israel-Hezbollah war in 2006. Bilal's term ended in April 2011 when he was succeeded by Adnan Mahmoud.

Personal life
Bilal speaks Arabic, English, Spanish, and Italian.

References

External links
 Interview in Italian as Syrian Minister of Information  (November 2010)

1944 births
Living people
University of Padua alumni
Perelman School of Medicine at the University of Pennsylvania alumni
Syrian ministers of information
Ambassadors of Syria to Spain
Academic staff of Damascus University
Syrian Alawites
Members of the Regional Command of the Arab Socialist Ba'ath Party – Syria Region
Syrian surgeons
21st-century diplomats
21st-century Syrian politicians